Frederick Delano Newman (June 17, 1935 – July 3, 2011) was an American philosopher, psychotherapist, playwright, and political activist and the creator of a therapeutic modality, Social Therapy.

Early life
Born in 1935 in New York City's The Bronx, Newman grew up in a working-class neighborhood. He served in the US Army, including a stint in Korea. Then, he attended the City College of New York under the GI Bill. He earned a Ph.D. in analytic philosophy and in foundations of mathematics from Stanford University in 1962. After his graduate work at Stanford, Newman taught at several colleges and universities in the 1960s, including the City College of New York, Knox College, Case Western Reserve University, and Antioch College.

Work

 The Practice of Method – An Introduction to the Foundations of Social Therapy (Fred Newman, Lois Hood (née Holzman), & Staff of the New York Institute for Social Therapy and Research, 1979, The New York Institute for Social Therapy and Research)

During the 1960s and 1970s, there were diverse challenges to authoritarian and repressive social and political institutions.  The institutions of psychiatry and psychotherapy, in particular, were the targets of passionate critiques by Sylvere Lotringer, R.D. Laing, and Thomas Szasz, among others.  There were significant challenges to the class, racial, patriarchal, and homophobic biases in psychoanalysis and in Freudian and neo-Freudian therapies.  There were also attempts to synthesize Marx and Freud.

The Practice of Method, is the seminal written work on social therapy, the first published formulation by Newman and his colleagues of a Marxist approach to therapy. Social therapy came, in later years, to be influenced by other thinkers (notably Vygotsky and Wittgenstein) and other therapeutic approaches (notably cognitive behavioral therapy).  The Practice of Method exposes the roots of social therapy.  It is the beginning of a continuing investigation of method in the study of human growth and development, to which Newman (together with his chief collaborator, Lois Holzman) returns again and again in his later work.

In The Practice of Method, the title itself is the first provocation in a book that is full of them. A method is conventionally understood as something which is applied to (practiced on) appropriate objects. The practice of method is propounded as a new conception of method – not a method to be practiced, but a method that is a practice.

Another provocation is directed at anti-Marxists.  Newman and his colleagues do not use the neutral description "conventional".  The Marxist method that is a practice is counter posed to the dualist (or "bourgeois") method to be practiced.  However, although Newman and his colleagues locate themselves decisively as Marxists and revolutionaries, little ink is wasted polemicizing against capitalism.  The oppressiveness of capitalism is taken for granted, and the argument is relatively free of leftist rhetoric.  The question of Marxist method is pursued, making use of The German Ideology, The Grundrisse, The 1844 Economic and Philosophic Manuscripts, Theses on Feuerbach, and Capital, as well as some of Vygotsky's observations.

A third provocation is that Newman and his colleagues disclaim the role of bourgeois radical, or "dissident", along with the related activities of consciousness-raising, radical therapy, and "socialist therapy".  These roles and activities (sometimes predicated on a nominal Marxism) are rejected, despite being well intentioned, because they are premised on the negation, rather than the overthrow, of bourgeois methodology and ideology.  (It turns out that the difference between negation and overthrow turns decisively on the question of method.)

To sum up, the authors locate The Practice of Method in what might be called (after Lukács) the actuality of the revolution.  As a result, to anti-Marxists and dissidents indifferent to Marx, it may seem dogmatic.  Marxists and revolutionaries, on the other hand, may find themselves impatient with the modest goals of the book.  They will be struck by the contrast between the world-historic perspective of Marx on the one hand, and the subtle distinctions and nuances that characterize the practice of method and the painstaking detail of social therapeutic practice on the other.  They may even disdain altogether the attempt at a Marxist treatment of subjectivity as "idealism".

Newman and his colleagues make no effort to reconcile these points of view.  On their view, social therapy is not socialist, but it is Marxist.  If the world is not actually (historically) in a transition to socialism, then social therapy and the practice of method are historically invalid.  On the other hand, if the world is in such a transition, all other methods and therapies are invalid.

The Practice of Method is self-reflexive, and this is one of the challenges in reading it.  Its form is expressive of its content.  One feels, from the first page, in medias res.  It slowly becomes clear that this anti-foundationalism is indeed part of what is meant by the practice of method.  It is not definitional. It is not conclusionary.  As Wittgenstein might say, Newman et al. "move around and about" the practice of method.  It is not built up from particulars.  Rather, the particulars are understood (and are shown to be meaningful) by their location within it.

Here are a few of the particulars:

A Marx-Freud synthesis?
Some have tried to "synthesize" Marx and Freud.  One such attempt (Lichtman, "Marx's Theory of Human Nature", Socialist Revolution, 1977) is examined in detail.  Newman and his colleagues attempt to show that the very notion of synthesizing Freud and Marx embodies the dualistic Weltanschauung of bourgeois science.  Such a synthesis distorts both Marx and Freud.  It regards them as separate (thus fetishized) products of bourgeois science.  In doing so, it subsumes, uncritically, the dualistic method of bourgeois science.

In contrast, in the practice of method there are no products that are clearly separate.  Just as Capital is not an alternative to bourgeois economics, but a critique of it, Freud is neither right nor wrong.  Transference is not simply negated by social therapy, but "engaged in struggle".  As Vygotsky might say, it is both a result and a tool for further development.  (At the very end of The Practice of Method, there is fascinating account of a group therapy session which attempts to engage transference in just this way.  The childish regression that Freud attributes to the individual in the group is not denied.  On the contrary, it is ruthlessly exposed (reorganized) in the context of practicing method.)

In rejecting a Marx-Freud synthesis, Newman and his colleagues would seem to be rejecting the dialectic of Hegel (and of Feuerbach) in favor of Marx's dialectic.  In the practice of method, Freud's understanding is both a result (the raw material) and tool in the development of a Marxist understanding.  In history, Marx and Freud are already integrated.  The attempt to integrate them actually disintegrates them.

Understanding
On the view of Newman and his colleagues, helping people with emotional suffering ("curing" them) requires engaging and reorganizing how they understand.  Emotional suffering is not a fixed input.  Like human subjectivity in general, it is a relationship between what people experience socially, and the tools available to them for understanding it.  It is common knowledge that individuals are able to function at a high level and endure extraordinary physical and emotional suffering, if they experience a coherency between what is demanded of them by social institutions, and their understanding of these demands.

Human psychology, understanding, and mode of explanation are broadly conceived in Marxist terms, as part of the organization of production.  As the coherency between the forces of production and the organization of production breaks down, understanding breaks down too, and with it people's ability to function socially.

Scientific explanation
Newman and his colleagues locate bourgeois science as a mode of investigation and explanation of world-historical importance.  From a Marxist perspective, the development of scientific technology has been crucial to whatever coherence exists between the forces of capitalist production and their organization.  It is thus a major factor in what has made capitalism historically progressive.

As this coherence breaks down, however, the adequacy of science as a universal mode of understanding is challenged.  Such are the historical origins of the critique of bourgeois science (beginning with Marx, and finding expression eventually, in some form, in the discoveries of Einstein, Gödel, and Quine).

Bourgeois science is dualistic as a mode of explanation.  As a method to be practiced, in arriving at its conclusions it makes a fundamental distinction between the initial conditions and the phenomena that can be deduced from them by the application of the appropriate method.  The deductive mode of explanation attempts to understand what happens in light of what has happened before as a precondition.  It sees the inputs (the conditions) as producing a predictable output.  This happens to be progressive (that is, it works very well) when the fields of application are the laws of motion of inert matter (and other physical sciences and their associated technologies).  However, in the realm of human activity, this eliminates subjectivity as a factor.

Thus, the method to be practiced of dualistic science is to be distinguished from the monistic practice of method.  On Freud's dualistic understanding, human beings and their subjectivity are produced by society, but society itself is produced by fixed inputs.  On Marx's account, there is a dialectic.  Human beings and their subjectivity are produced by society and society itself is produced by these same human beings. (See Theses on Feuerbach.)  Thus, on Freud's view, there is no accounting for the transformation of society – and therefore no accounting for human development.  It is simply left out.

Thus, what follows deductively does not follow historically. Such is the case with human emotions and subjectivity.  If activity is not a fixed input (and if human beings are the makers of history at the same time that they are products of it) emotions are not explainable entirely in terms of their preconditions.  Relationships with parents and childhood experiences of all kinds are no doubt factors.  But they cannot be the full story.

On this understanding, growing emotionally – becoming more powerful, more productive, and happier in one's life – requires that bourgeois understanding itself be engaged and challenged.  But this engagement does not end with the critique of bourgeois science.  The critique is one component of a practice (and for most people seeking help, not the first one to be encountered).  What matters most is not that patients understand the critique in its entirety, but that they are getting therapeutic help from therapists who are actively struggling to express the critique in their practice.  As Newman and his colleagues express it, "knowing better" is not the same thing as "being better".

Even on the most sympathetic reading, The Practice of Method is a sprawling and frustrating work.  Its insights are suggestive and intriguing, but will seem to some to be insufficiently developed.  Yet here too (to see a strength, as well as a limitation) its form is expressive of its content. It self-reflexively practices method.  It demands that the reader – if only qua reader – be an activist. On its own account, it is not a theoretical treatise, but a component of the practice of social therapy and, in fairness, cannot be judged except in relation to that practice.

While provoking pretty much everybody, The Practice of Method is also an invitation.  It invites readers (whoever they might be) to participate in "a change that is an understanding".  Are such participants "revolutionaries"?  A categorical answer to this question is rejected.  The practice of method does not answer every question – to paraphrase Vygotsky, it only answers those that are raised by history.

 "Undecidable Emotions (What is Social Therapy?  And How Is it Revolutionary?)" (Newman, 2003, Journal of Constructivist Psychology)		

This article seeks to illuminate a revolutionary approach to group therapy by an appeal to – of all things – twentieth century discoveries in science and mathematical logic.

"Is the set of all sets that are not members of themselves a member of itself?"  The paradoxical answer to this self-referential question (if it is it isn't and if it isn't it is) turns out to be not just an amusing parlor trick, but the tip of a very big iceberg.  Gödel showed that formal systems complex enough to be interesting are inherently undecidable – there are propositions that cannot be shown, within the system, to be either true or false, and this problem cannot be obviated by ad hoc devices.

This is prologue to the even more provocative claim that the great majority of our statements, whether self-referential or not, embody a descriptive/denotative bias and the "less dramatic but more pervasive paradoxes of referentiality."  In the broader culture, reality comes to be understood as identical to its description.  But this runs up against the problematic that any event can be described in infinitely many ways.

The upshot is that it is not possible in logic (and, a fortiori, anywhere else) to comprehend sets (and other collections, like therapy groups) as simple aggregates of their members.  It is, therefore, remarkable that "the so-called social sciences", in holding to the view that a group can be understood in terms of the relationships of its members (it is decidable), are working with a scientific paradigm that has been abandoned by the hard sciences that they have tried so hard to emulate from their inception.

On Newman's account, the discovery of undecidability changes mathematics, physics and cosmology, and it also changes group therapy.  For all of them, the universe is now bigger and, in a sense, freer.  In mathematics, undecidability leads to new conceptions of proof, and in social therapeutics "the study of emotional activity is continually generative of relevant 'unstudied' activity."  The resolution of emotional conflicts (like the proofs in undecidable mathematical systems) must be continuously created.  "First principles" are repudiated, in favor of the continuous activity of the group.

 "All Power to the Developing!" (Newman & Holzman, 2003, Annual Review of Critical Psychology)

This article examines the two Marxist notions, class struggle (The Communist Manifesto) and revolutionary activity (Theses on Feuerbach).  Left analysis has tended both to conflate the two, and to over emphasize class struggle at the expense of revolutionary activity.  Class struggle (central to revolutionary movements in the 19th and 20th centuries) has become "an outmoded modernist tool."  Revolutionary activity, by contrast "is the post-modern tool-and-result – simultaneously anti-capitalist and constructive – with which human beings can change the world."

Social therapy is characterized as "revolution for non-revolutionaries." In addition to Marx, it uses the insights of Vygotsky and Wittgenstein.  It seeks to enlist "patients" in the collective work of constructing new environments that challenge the commodification of emotionality, and re-ignite human development.

 Let's Pretend – Solving the Education Crisis in America: 
 A Special Report (Newman & Fulani, 2011, All Stars Project)

What if all the kids currently failing in American schools pretended to be good learners, and all the concerned adults played along?  The thesis of this paper is that such a "performance" would solve the education crisis in America. Several connected arguments are brought to bare on this idea.  First, successful interventions into the "achievement gap" (like the Harlem Children's Zone) are attributed, not primarily to tougher standards and better teaching, but to an overall approach that draws students into highly organized "ensemble performances."  Second, an appeal is made to a wealth of social research showing that there is a close connection between "performance in social contexts" and human development.  Finally, a distinction is drawn between learning and development and it is argued that the learning gap cannot be closed without closing the development gap between poor children and children from more affluent circumstances.

A seemingly preposterous idea (pretending our way out of the crisis in education) acquires a certain plausibility.  The provocative formulation (typical of Newman's writing) seems calculated to expose that the obstacles to implementing such a proposal are primarily institutional and political.

Marxism, influences, and views
Newman considered himself a Marxist, a philosophy that he incorporated into his therapeutic approach in an attempt to address the alienating effects of societal institutions on human development. In his earliest statement of his attempt to develop a Marxist approach to emotional problems, Newman wrote in 1974:

Proletarian or revolutionary psychotherapy is a journey which begins with the rejection of our inadequacy and ends in the acceptance of our smallness; it is the overthrow of the rulers of the mind by the workers of the mind.

Later, Newman (along with his primary collaborator, Lois Holzman) incorporated other influences, including the 20th-century philosopher Ludwig Wittgenstein and Aleksey Leontyev and Sergei Rubinshtein's activity theory, and the work of early Russian psychologist Lev Vygotsky.

Newman and Holzman challenged what they described as the "hoax/myth of psychology," the various components of which were termed "destructive pieces of pseudoscience."

Politics

Political roots
Newman founded the collective Centers for Change (CFC) in the late 1960s after the student strikes at Columbia University. CFC was dedicated to 1960s-style, radical community organizing and the practice of Newman's evolving form of psychotherapy, which he would term around 1974 "proletarian therapy" and later "Social Therapy." CFC briefly merged with Lyndon LaRouche's National Caucus of Labor Committees (NCLC) in 1974, but a few months, the alliance fell apart, an event that Newman attributed to LaRouche's increasingly "paranoid" and "authoritarian" direction and to the NCLC's "capacity to produce psychosis and to opportunistically manipulate it in the name of socialist politics."

In August 1974, the CFC went on to found the International Workers Party (IWP), a revolutionary party that was explicitly Marxist-Leninist. In the wake of another factional fight in 1976, the IWP publicly disbanded. In 2005, Newman told The New York Times that the IWP had transformed into a "core collective" that still functions. That claim appears to be consistent with critics who had alleged several years earlier that the organization had never actually disbanded and remained secretly active.

Throughout the late 1970s, Newman and his core of organizers founded or assumed control of a number of small grassroots organizations, including a local branch of the People's Party, known as the New York Working People's Party; the New York City Unemployed and Welfare Council; and the Labor Community Alliance for Change.

Electoral politics
In 1979, Newman became one of the founders of the New Alliance Party (NAP), which was most notable for getting African-American psychologist and activist Lenora Fulani on the ballot in all 50 states during her 1988 presidential campaign, making her the first African-American and the first woman to do so. Newman served primarily as the party's tactician and campaign manager. In 1985, Newman ran for Mayor of New York. He also ran for US Senator that year and for New York State Attorney General in 1990.

Independence Party of New York
After the New Alliance Party was dissolved in 1994, a number of its members and supporters, including Newman and Fulani, joined the Independence Party of New York (IPNY). It had been founded by activists in Rochester, New York in 1991 but became more important in other parts of the state after the rise of Ross Perot's Reform Party. In 2005, the Executive Committee voted Fulani off and, some months later, attempted to disenroll Fulani, Newman and more than 140 other IPNY members from New York City.  (See "Controversy" below.)

Playwriting, theater, and social therapy
Newman was a cofounder (1983), artistic director (1989–2005), and playwright-in-residence of the Castillo Theatre in New York. The theater, named for the Guatemalan poet Otto René Castillo, has served as the primary venue for the production of the 30 plays that Newman wrote since the 1980s, four of which were written for and performed at annual conventions of the American Psychological Association from 1996 onwards. Newman described the Castillo Theatre as a "sister" organization to his social therapy clinics and institutes, where he also used Vygotsky's methodological approach. Writing in 2000 in New Therapist, Newman and Holzman discussed the Vygotskian thread that linked the sister organizations:

The entire enterprise - human life and its study - is a search for method. Performance social therapeutics, the name we use to describe our Marxian-based, dialectical practice, originated in our group therapy but is also the basis for a continuously emergent development community.

We coined the term tool-and-result methodology for Vygotsky's (and our) practice of method in order to distinguish it from the instrumental tool for result methodology that characterizes the natural and social sciences (Newman and Holzman, 1993). Our community building and the projects that comprise it - the East Side Institute for Short Term Psychotherapy, the East Side Center for Social Therapy and affiliated centers in other cities, the Castillo Theatre, the All Stars Talent Show Network, the Development School for Youth, etc. - are practices of this methodology.

Some of Newman's plays have been cited as examples of alleged anti-Semitism by the Anti-Defamation League (ADL), which Newman described as "politically motivated". In his play No Room for Zion (1989), Newman recounts the transition in his own Bronx Jewish community from primarily working class to increasingly middle class and upwardly mobile, rapidly losing its identity as an immigrant community tied to traditional ideals (represented by the Rabbi Zion of the play's title). In the play, Newman goes on to present his view of the postwar shifts in Jewish political alignments, both domestically and internationally:

From the West Bank to the West Side of Manhattan, international Jewry was being forced to face its written-in-blood deal with the capitalist devil. In exchange for an unstable assimilation, Jews under the leadership of Zionism would "do-unto-others-what-others-had-done-unto-them." The others to be done unto? People of color. The doing? Ghettoization and genocide. The Jew, the dirty Jew, once the ultimate victim of capitalism's soul, fascism, would become a victimizer on behalf of capitalism, a self-righteous dehumanizer and murderer of people of color, a racist bigot whom in the language of Zionism changed the meaning of "Never Again" from "Never Again for anyone" to "Never again for us – and let the devil take everyone else.

The ADL also criticized the Newman's 2004 play, Crown Heights, which was based on the 1991 riots sparked by the accidental death of a black child who was struck and killed by the motorcade of a prominent local rabbi. The ADL claimed that the production "distorts history and refuels hatred." One reviewer considered the production to be one that "seeks to unite the city's diverse youth and heal some of the wounds of past racial violence."

The Castillo and its parent charity, the All Stars Project, Inc., supported Newman's therapeutic endeavors, such aw a number of supplementary education programs for youth, including the Joseph A. Forgione Development School for Youth.

On December 6, 2005, Newman announced his retirement as the Castillo's artistic director in the wake of controversy over a six-part series the previous month on NY1 News (a cable television news channel). In a letter to the All Stars Project's Board of Directors, Newman explained that he did not "want any of the controversy associated with my views and opinions to create unnecessary difficulties for the All Stars Project." The cable program contained segments of an interview in which Newman discussed his longstanding opposition to having his therapeutic approach being governed by the American Psychological Association's ethical guidelines, notably those prohibiting sexual relations with patients.

Controversy and response

"Therapy Cult" allegations
In 1977, Dennis King, writing for Heights and Valley News, penned an article that alleged Newman was the leader of a "therapy cult." The Public Eye magazine also carried an article in late 1977 making the claim, but it was primarily directed at Lyndon LaRouche's NCLC (with which Newman was no longer affiliated). At the time, Newman responded that "it is of the greatest importance that the entire community of social scientists insist that there be open and critical discussion and dialogue towards the advancement and development of the human sciences; that as scientists and as professionals we do not quiver and shake under the socio-pathological and essentially anti-communist rampages of a Dennis King or others like him." Cult allegations arose again a few years later in the Village Voice.

When political researcher Chip Berlet became editor of The Public Eye magazine in 1984, he first announced that the magazine no longer held to that characterization:

As you will learn from a forthcoming article on Fred Newman and the IWP, the Public Eye no longer feels it is accurate to call Newman's political network a cult. We do feel that at one point in its development it was fair to characterize the group as a cult, and we still have strong criticisms of the group's organizing style and the relationship between Newman's Therapy Institute and his political organizing. (Editor's Note, Public Eye, 1984; Vol. 4, Nos. 3-4)

In 1988, a special issue of Radical America carried a series of articles and essays alleging manipulation, political deceit, and cult-like practices within the NAP. While Berlet, who had contributed to the issue, noted that Fulani "deserves tremendous credit for apparently gaining ballot status in a majority of states," the editors concluded that there were "dangerous... implications" in failing to confront Newman and his groups: "Painful and unpleasant as it is, the time has come to expose the NAP before it discredits the Left – especially among blacks, gays and those exploring progressive politics for the first time."

A former NAP campaign worker, Loren Redwood, gave a much more critical account of her experiences with the party in a 1989 letter to the editor of Coming Up!, a lesbian and gay newspaper published in San Francisco. In the letter, Redwood describes her falling in love with a NAP campaign worker and the difficulties she encountered after joining her lover on the road campaigning for Fulani:

NAP claims to be a multi-racial, black led, woman led, pro gay, political party, an organization which recognizes and fights against racism, sexism, classism and homophobia – but NAP is a lie. NAP is always using the slogan: "the personal is political" and emphasizing the importance of enacting one's politics into daily life. But this vision and the way their politics are enacted within the organization and life of those working for them is very much in conflict. As a working class lesbian, I thought I had finally found a political movement which included me. What I found instead was an oppressive, disempowering, misogynistic machine. All my decisions were made for me by someone else. I was told where to go, and who to go with.

I worked seven days a week – 16 to 20 hours a day (I had two days off in 2.5 months). There was an incredible urgency which overrode any personal needs or considerations, an urgency that meant complete self-sacrifice. I realize now how sexist that is. As a woman, I have always been taught that self-sacrifice is good and that I must be willing to give up everything for the greater good for all. Traditionally, this has come in the form of a husband and children; NAP is simply a substitute. I felt totally powerless over my life, forced into a very submissive role where all control of my life belonged to someone else.

In 1989, Newman told The New York Times that his critics were "being sectarian and refusing to recognize the extraordinary accomplishments" of Fulani and the NAP leadership.

Interviewed in the Times in 1991, Newman described the criticisms as "absurd" and the product of jealousies on the left and claimed that most social therapy clients do not involve themselves in his political activities. In the Boston Globe in 1992, Fulani claimed "the entire thing is a lie" and cited what she described as Political Research Associates' ties to the Democratic Party.

Social psychologist Alexandra Stein wrote a dissertation about the Newman operation. Arguing that it was a cult, Stein stated that members were recruited by therapy sessions and then controlled with fear. Exhausted by overwork and constant crisis, members clung to the organization and its charismatic leader for safety. According to Stein, a member named Marina Ortiz fled only after the group instructed her to put her son in foster care.

Response to allegations

By therapeutic professionals
Some of the cult criticisms have been disputed by some of Newman's peers in the therapeutic milieu. According to British psychologist Ian Parker, "Even those [Newman and Holzman] who have been marked by the FBI as a 'cult' may still be a source of useful radical theory and practice. Like a weed, a cult is something that is growing in the wrong place. We would want to ask 'wrong' for who, and whether it might sometimes be right for us. We have no desire to line up with the psychological establishment to rule out of the debate those who offer something valuable to anti-racist, feminist or working-class practice."

By Newman and Holzman
Newman (along with Holzman) responded to the ongoing controversy in a 2003 interview with John Söderlund, the editor of New Therapist, in a special issue devoted to mind control. In her introduction to the responses, Holzman claimed that the editor's questions "have that 'When did you stop beating your wife?' quality":

These kinds of attacks are ludicrous in the way that the charge of being a witch was in centuries past. A cult is a made-up thing for which (like the made-up witch) there is no falsifiability. An entire mythology can thus be created, complete with attributes and activities that cannot be proven or disproven. Indeed, that's the virtue of such made-up things. They paint a picture that holds you captive.

Söderlund asked about the recent focus of the American Psychological Association on the "potential dangers of mind control." Newman replied that he did not quite know what was meant by the term and noted, "The closest association I have to it is what happens between parents and their young children. When children are very young, parents create a very controlled environment where there's a great level of dependency on the parents. Gradually, as children come to experience other kinds of institutions (day care, school, etc.) their lived environment becomes less controlled and their dependency lessens." He explained that he did not think that sort of "totally controlled environment" to be imposable on an adult relationship "outside of the extraordinary circumstances of say, the Manchurian Candidate. I don't see how mind control has any applicability to therapy—therapy of any kind—as it's a relationship where the clients have control.... They pay, they can not show up, etc." Newman acknowledged that he believed that authoritarian and coercive therapists were likely doing bad therapy, but he did not consider that to be mind control.

Söderlund asked Newman to respond to an anonymous former social therapist's statement that the practice has "the criteria of groups which are considered cults: an authoritarian, charismatic leader, black-and-white thinking, repression of individuality, constant drive for fundraising, control of information, lack of tolerance for opposition within the group, etc." Newman claimed he did not know what a cult was or even if there was such a thing and that the use of the cult charge is "hostile, mean-spirited, and destructive." He denied being "authoritarian," acknowledged the perception that he was "charismatic," and considered the claim of "black-and-white thinking" to be "antithetical to everything we do" and cited social therapy's interactions "with practitioners and theorists across a very wide spectrum of traditions and worldviews." Newman countered the charge by insisting, "We don't repress individuality; we critique it. There is a difference!" Newman commented as well on charges that he "held in contempt" ethical guidelines of professional associations such as the APA: "We don't look to the APA, CPA or any other institution for ethical standards," he replied. "We're critical (not contemptuous) of them for being hypocritical and think that depending on them for an ethical standard is ethically unsound."

Newman, et al. vs the FBI
FBI documents obtained in 1992 by the Freedom of Information Act showed that during Fulani's 1988 campaign for president, it had begun a file that classified her party as a "political cult" that "should be considered armed and dangerous." As described by investigative reporter Kelvyn Anderson in the Washington City Paper in 1992, "The 101-page FBI file, freed by an FOIA request, also contains media coverage of Fulani's 1988 campaign, memos between FBI field offices on the subject of the New Alliance Party, a letter from an army counterintelligence official about party, and a copy of Clouds Blur the Rainbow, a report issued in late 1987 by Chip Berlet of Political Research Associates (PRA). PRA, which studies fringe political groups and intelligence agency abuses, is a prominent critic of the NAP, and its research is frequently used to discredit NAP as a psycho-political cult with totalitarian overtones."

Newman, Fulani, and the New Alliance Party challenged the FBI in a 1993 lawsuit asserting the FBI "political cult" labeling had violated their constitutional rights. The plaintiffs asserted that the bureau was gathering information from private, third-party organizations to evade federal guidelines prohibiting investigations of political organizations in the absence of evidence of criminal activity. In their suit, Newman et al. argued:

Political intelligence reports like [the ADL's 1990 report] The New Alliance Party and [PRA's] Clouds Blur the Rainbow, could not constitutionally be funded by the FBI directly. Organizations like the ADL and PRA engage in political intelligence gathering and political attacks on plaintiffs which the defendants are barred from carrying out directly by the Guidelines. The FBI then distributes the results of those "private" studies to its agents, and gives credibility to the "private" findings by incorporating the reports into files that are then obtained through FOIA by journalists and others

In her ruling on the case, Federal Judge Constance Baker Motley ruled that the "political cult" charge "could not be directly traced to the 1988 FBI investigation" and that "any stigmatization which NAP suffers could be traced to a myriad of statements and publications made by private individuals and organizations, many of which preceded the FBI investigation.

Berlet, while upholding the charge of cultism, was critical of the FBI by noting that its investigation was "not a protection of civil liberties but a smear of a group."

Independence Party seeks to disenroll Newman and Fulani
In September 2005, the New York State Executive Committee of the Independence Party, under the leadership of IPNY State Chairman Frank MacKay, voted to remove Fulani and several other members. In a letter proposing the matter for vote, MacKay stated Fulani et al. had created the perception that the IPNY leadership tolerated "bigotry and hatred" and had "continually re-affirmed their disturbing social commentary in the state and national press."

A later petition by MacKay to have Fulani and Newman, among others, disenrolled from the party was entirely dismissed by the New York Supreme Court in both Brooklyn and Manhattan. Manhattan Justice Emily Jane Goodman wrote that "the statements attributed to Fulani and Newman which many would consider odious and offensive were made by them in 1989 and 1985, respectively, and not in their capacity as Independence Party members or officers in the Party which did not even exist at the time." Goodman noted the timing of the petition appeared "more political than philosophical." More to the point, however, the petitioned grounds for disenrollment were ruled invalid because "there are no enunciated standards or requirements for persons registering in the Party."

Further controversies and evaluations
The cult charges appeared again in the 2004 Presidential election, and have extended beyond Newman and Fulani to include other independent political challengers, most recently, 2004 independent presidential candidate Ralph Nader. The Nation magazine, a leading liberal weekly which had supported Nader in 2000, asked, citing Berlet's report, "what in the world is Ralph Nader doing in bed with the ultrasectarian cult-racket formerly known as the New Alliance Party?"

In its introduction to an article later that year by political writer Christopher Hitchens, the magazine Vanity Fair noted, "Democrats are furious that Ralph Nader, whose last presidential bid helped put George W. Bush in office, is running again. Equally dismaying, the author finds, is Nader's backing from a crackpot group with ties to Pat Buchanan, Lyndon LaRouche, and Louis Farrakhan." Echoing Berlet (who had attacked Nader in 2000 for working with figures like conservative industrialist Roger Milliken), Hitchens charged that "[t]he Newman-Fulani group is a fascistic zombie cult outfit." Nader came under fire from the ADL that year for his own Middle East views.

These criticisms of Newman's organizations contrast with other evaluations of the Newman-founded All Stars Project. In 2003, the Institute for Minority Education of Columbia University's Teachers College undertook an evaluation of All Stars programs that was coordinated and funded by All Stars Project staff and supporters. The 124-page report was based on extensive on-site observation of two of the All Stars programs, which were described as "an exemplary effort in a field that is bursting with creative activity" The evaluations authors noted that they had "not had access to data referable to the impact of these interventions on the short or long term behavioral development of learner participants. The report made only one brief reference (on page 9) to controversies regarding All Stars staff and volunteers being "involved in various political movements, most centrally Independent [sic] Party politics ... [w]hile sometimes used as a point of attack by unfriendly media, the political networking has given the All Stars Project access to some halls of power that would have otherwise been closed." The Columbia researchers noted on page 14 of their report that the political character of the All Stars program: "Although political activism is not an explicit part of the All Stars and the DSY curriculum, it is an outcome of the programs. Young people who are empowered to get what they want are also likely to fight for what they think is right ... [T]he participants and staff of the ASTSN/DSY (All Stars Talent Show Network/Development School for Youth) have developed policy approaches to working with youth that are practical, efficient, and successful. That they have also worked to develop some influence in the halls of power is a tremendous asset to the development of the programs—as well as to the political process, which needs all the direction it can get in developing and implementing policy."

In 2006, the New York City Industrial Development Agency performed a review of the All Stars pursuant to an All Stars application for a bond. Several Democratic Party officials expressed strong opposition. Critics of the IDA bond, including New York State Comptroller Alan Hevesi, charged that the All Stars were connected to "leaders who have taken positions that are misogynistic and Anti-Semitic", and questioned whether Newman and Fulani still ran All Stars, despite their having stepped down from official positions.

Despite public criticisms, the IDA board voted 6 to 4 in favor of approving the bond, with all those in favor being mayoral appointees or representatives of ex officio members who were mayoral appointees, while those opposed were representatives of the offices of the Borough Presidents of Manhattan, the Bronx, and Queens, as well as the office of then-New York City Comptroller William C. Thompson Jr. After the vote, IDA chairman Joshua J. Sirefman told reporters that, based on the IDA's review of the All Stars Project, "[w]e have determined that the organization is in good standing, we found no evidence of misconduct of any kind by the organization, and we established that the project would benefit New York City... We are aware that allegations of wrongdoing by individuals associated with the organization existed a number of years ago."

In subsequent news coverage, Mayor Michael Bloomberg defended the Agency's vote to approve the bonds, noting "I don't think I heard one argument made that there was something wrong with the All Stars Project and that's what we look at."

Personal life

He was twice married and divorced. He is survived by his son, Donald; his daughter, Elizabeth Newman; and by Gabrielle L. Kurlander and Jacqueline Salit, his life partners in what Ms. Salit described as an "unconventional family of choice."

Publications

Newman, F. and Holzman, L. (in press). All Power to the Developing. To appear in the Annual Review of Critical Psychology.
Holzman, L. and Newman, F. (2004). Power, authority and pointless activity (The developmental discourse of social therapy.)   In T. Strong and D. Paré (Eds.), Furthering talk: Advances in the discursive therapies . Kluwer Academic/Plenum, pp. 73–86.
Newman, F. (2003). Undecidable emotions (What is social therapy? And how is it revolutionary?). Journal of Constructivist Psychology, 16: 215-232.
Power, authority and pointless activity (The developmental discourse of social therapy).*Newman, F. and Holzman, L. (2001). La relevancia de Marx en la Terapeutica del siglo XXI. Revista Venezolana de Psicologia Clinica Comunitaria, No. 2, 47-55.
Newman, F. (2001). Therapists of the world, unite. New Therapist. No. 16.
Newman, F. (2001). Rehaciendo el pasado: Unas cuantas historias exitosas en materia de Terapia Social y sus moralejas. Revista Venezolana de Psicologia Clinica Comunitaria, No. 2, 57-70.
Newman, F. (2000) Does a story need a theory? (understanding the methodology of narrative therapy). In D. Fee (Ed.) Pathology and the postmodern: mental illness as discourse and experience. London: Sage.
Newman F. and Holzman, L. (2000). Against Against-ism. Theory & Psychology, 10(2), 265-270.
Newman, F. and Holzman, L. (2000). Engaging the alienation. New Therapist, 10(4).
Newman, F. and Holzman, L. (2000). The relevance of Marx to therapeutics in the 21st century. New Therapist, 5, 24-27.
Newman, F. (1999). One dogma of dialectical materialism. Annual Review of Critical Psychology, 1. 83-99.
Newman, F. and L. Holzman. (1999). Beyond narrative to performed conversation (in the beginning comes much later). Journal of Constructivist Psychology, 12, 1, 23-40.
Newman, F. and Holzman, L. (1997). The end of knowing: A new developmental way of learning. London: Routledge.
Newman, F. (1996). Performance of a lifetime: A practical-philosophical guide to the joyous life. New York: Castillo.
Newman, F. and Holzman, L. (1996). Unscientific psychology: A cultural-performatory approach to understanding human life. Westport, CT: Praeger.
Newman, F. (1994). Let's develop! A guide to continuous personal growth. New York: Castillo International.
Newman, F. and Holzman, L. (1993). Lev Vygotsky: Revolutionary scientist. London: Routledge.
Newman, F. (1992). Surely Castillo is left but is it right or wrong? Nobody knows. The Drama Review. Fall (T135), pp. 24– 27.
Newman, F. (1991). The myth of psychology. New York: Castillo International.
Holzman, L. and Newman, F. (1979). The practice of method: An introduction to the foundations of social therapy. New York: New York Institute for Social Therapy and Research.
Newman, F. (1977). Practical-critical activities. New York: Institute for Social Therapy.
Newman, F. (1974). Power and authority: The inside view of the class struggle. New York: Centers for Change.
Newman, F., assisted by Daren, Hazel (1974). A Manifesto on Method: A Study of the Transformation from the Capitalist Mind to the Fascist Mind. New York: International Workers Party.
Newman, F. (1968). Explanation by description: An essay on historical methodology. The Hague: Mouton.
Newman, F. (1982). Games the New Alliance Party Won't Play

References

External links

Newman-related websites
 Eastside Institute for Group and Short-term Psychotherapy
 Lois Holzman
 Performing the World
 The Social Therapy Group
 Life Performance Coaching Center
 Atlanta Center for Social Therapy
 All Stars Project
 Castillo Theatre
 Committee for a Unified Independent Party
 Independent Voting

Newman's critics
 Studies on Newman from Political Research Associates; PRA claims to "expose movements, institutions, and ideologies that undermine human rights". Contains only anti-Newman reports.
 Alexandra Stein, Terror, Love and Brainwashing: Attachment in Cults and Totalitarian Systems, (2016) Taylor and Francis.

Response to critics
 Fred Newman and his Critics from official website

1935 births
2011 deaths
20th-century American philosophers
20th-century American Jews
American Marxists
American philosophy academics
Jewish anti-Zionism in the United States
Jewish philosophers
Jewish socialists
Independence Party of New York politicians
Marxist theorists
People from the Bronx
American psychotherapists
Stanford University alumni
20th-century American dramatists and playwrights
21st-century American Jews
Stuyvesant High School alumni
City College of New York alumni